Andy Murray defeated Novak Djokovic in the final, 6–2, 7–5 to win the men's singles tennis title at the 2009 Miami Open.

Nikolay Davydenko was the reigning champion, but did not participate that year due to a left heel injury.

Seeds
All seeds receive a bye into the second round.

Draw

Finals

Top half

Section 1

Section 2

Section 3

Section 4

Bottom half

Section 5

Section 6

Section 7

Section 8

Qualifying

Seeds

Qualifiers

Lucky losers

Draw

First qualifier

Second qualifier

Third qualifier

Fourth qualifier

Fifth qualifier

Sixth qualifier

Seventh qualifier

Eighth qualifier

Ninth qualifier

Tenth qualifier

Eleventh qualifier

Twelfth qualifier

External links
Main Draw
Qualifying Draw

Sony Ericsson Open - Men's Singles
2009 Sony Ericsson Open